This is a list of films produced in France in 1968.

See also
1968 in France

Notes

References

External links
 French films of 1968 at the Internet Movie Database
French films of 1968 at Cinema-francais.fr

1968
Films
French